Doktor Mladen is a 1975 Yugoslav biographical film directed by Midhat Mutapdžić, on the life of Mladen Stojanović during the Second World War.

Cast 
 Ljuba Tadić - Dr. Mladen Stojanovic
 Pavle Vuisić Radovan Tadic 
 Ljubiša Samardžić - Stanisa
 Husein Cokic - Djuka
 Zvonimir Črnko - Omer
 Rudi Alvadj - Jure
 Vlasta Knezovic - Danica
 Ana Karić - Doktorova supruga
 Jelena Zigon - Andja
 Zaim Muzaferija - Petar
 Dušan Janićijević - Joza
 Rastislav Jovic - Enver
 Igor Galo - Racan
 Vanja Drach - SS Major
 Uglješa Kojadinović - Ustaski satnik
 Zijah Sokolović - Huska

References

External links 

1975 films
1970s biographical films
1970s war drama films
Biographical films about physicians
Yugoslav war drama films
Films set in Yugoslavia
Cultural depictions of Serbian men
Cultural depictions of Yugoslav people
Yugoslav World War II films